Nursing Times is a website and monthly magazine for nurses, which is published in the United Kingdom. It covers original nursing research and best practice for nurses at all stages in their career, as well as daily news, opinion and other information relevant to the nursing profession.

History and profile
Nursing Times is the largest nursing website outside of the US. The majority of articles it publishes are either on nursing news or clinical subjects. For example, it contains a clinical archive of over 5,000 double-blind peer reviewed articles on all aspects of nursing. It also hosts an opinion section, long reads, career development information, clinical supplements and an innovation hub.

In addition, Nursing Times supports continuing professional development and work towards revalidation through its CPD Zone. The zone comprises around 20 user-friendly online learning units on fundamental aspects of nursing, clinical articles with online assessments for bitesize CPD, clinical articles with discussion handouts for participatory CPD, and a personal e-portfolio to store CPD and revalidation evidence.

Founded by Macmillan and Co Ltd, the first edition of Nursing Times was published on Saturday 6 May, 1905. The print edition of Nursing Times is currently published on a monthly basis, having been published weekly until January 2017. As well as the 2017 relaunch, Nursing Times underwent a previous major redesign in March 2009.

Nursing Times has regularly run campaigns on issues affecting nurses including most recently Time Out for Training (2008), A Seat on the Board (2010-2011), Speak Out Safely (2013-2014) and Covid-19: Are You OK (2020-).

In 2018, Nursing Times was inducted into the International Academy of Nursing Editors’ Nursing Journal Hall of Fame. It was named Special Interest Magazine of the Year at the 2019 Periodical Press Association Awards (PPAs).  

From July 2004 to July 2005 Nursing Times sold nearly 72,166 copies. The magazine had a circulation of 30,923 copies in 2008.

It was one of 13 titles acquired from Ascential (formerly Emap) by Metropolis International in a £23.5m cash deal, announced on 1 June 2017. Metropolis has retained the name emap for its B2B brands business, including Nursing Times.

The Nursing Times brand also produces a range of events and conferences. These include the flagship Nursing Times Awards and Student Nursing Times Awards, which is the only awards to solely recognise nurse education.

The Nursing Times Awards were launched in 1990 and, as of 2021, have 25 categories covering a wide range of nursing specialties from mental health to clinical research.

The Student Nursing Times Awards were launched in 2011 and, as of 2021, have 21 categories for students lecturers, practice supervisors, universities, NHS and private organisations.

Other events include the Nursing Times Workforce Summit & Awards, which was launched in 2018, the Patient Flow Forum, which was launched in 2020, regular Nursing Times Careers Live jobs fairs and webinars on a range of subjects.

See also
 List of nursing journals

References

External links

1905 establishments in the United Kingdom
Ascential
Business magazines published in the United Kingdom
Weekly magazines published in the United Kingdom
General nursing journals
Magazines established in 1905
Medical magazines
Professional and trade magazines